Rasoul Sadrameli (born 1954 in Isfahan) is an Iranian film director, screenwriter, journalist and film producer. The Managing Director of MILAD FILM (established in 1979, the first company in distribution and production of Iranian films after revolution) began his journalism career while he was just 17, and he collaborated with Etela'at Newspaper as reporter, storywriter and editor of Incident page and then as the Editor of Parliamentary Service. He studied sociology at Paul Valéry university of Montpellier in France. He began his professional activities in the Cinema by production of a film entitled Blood Raining in 1981. This film is the first cinematic project after revolution.

Filmography (as a director)
 The Liberation — 1982
 Deliverance — 1983
 Chrysanthemum — 1985
 During Autumn — 1987
 The Victim — 1991
 Symphony of Tehran — 1993
 The Girl in Sneakers — 1999
 I'm Taraneh, 15 — 2002
 Aida, I Saw Your Father Last Night — 2005
 Every Night Loneliness - 2008
 Life With Closed Eyes — 2010
 Waiting For A Miracle — 2011
 My Second Year in College — 2019

References

External links

Iranian film directors
Iranian screenwriters
Iranian film producers
Film people from Isfahan
1953 births
Living people
Crystal Simorgh for Best Director winners
Producers who won the Audience Choice of Best Film Crystal Simorgh
Crystal Simorgh for Best Screenplay winners